"Con altura" is a song by Spanish singer-songwriter Rosalía and Colombian singer J Balvin featuring Spanish musician el Guincho. Written by Rosalía, Balvin, Aury "Mariachi Budda" Pineda, el Guincho, Frank Dukes, Teo Halm, and Sky Rompiendo and produced by the last four alongside the Spanish singer, the song was released by Columbia Records on 28 March 2019.

"Con altura" peaked at number one in six countries, many of them Latin American, and started the ascent of Rosalía into the international music scene. The song was one of the best-performing singles of 2019, being streamed for over 1.5 billion times during the year. It was listed in many year-end lists and received critical acclaim, with Billboard ranking it fifth on their list of 100 Best Songs of 2019 as Pitchfork the eighth best.  "Con altura" won the Latin Grammy Award for Best Urban Song and was also nominated for a Teen Choice and an MTV Europe Music Award, among others.

Its music video, directed by Director X, accompanied its release the same day. It reached social media virality and became the most-watched female music video on YouTube of 2019. It earned the performers multiple accolades. Rosalía made history after winning two MTV Video Music Awards for Best Latin and Best Choreography as she became the first ever Spanish-winning artist at the ceremony. "Con altura" also appeared on Just Dance 2020 and Grand Theft Auto Online.

Background 
In May 2018, Colombian singer J Balvin released his fifth studio album Vibras (2018). The album included a collaboration with Rosalía called "Brillo", which reached the 19th position on the Spanish singles chart. In September 2018, Rosalía stayed a couple days in Miami due to her performance at the Ziff Ballet Opera House to celebrate her five Latin Grammy nominations. The singer told at a press conference in Argentina that the song was born there. The song includes a talked sample of Dominican influencer Mariachi Budda, which Rosalía eventually found on the Internet spontaneously and had coined and registered the phrase "Con altura".

At the end of 2018, Rosalía began to work on her third studio album, which was set to be released in mid-2021. By that time, she also began to announce the first dates of her debut world tour named El Mal Querer Tour. In December 2018, a snippet of the music video was posted by Balvin's team on their Instagram stories; the videos were deleted almost instantly. In March 2019, rumors began circulating about Rosalía performing new (un)released song(s) on her tour. Those rumors were confirmed by Rosalía herself when she finally announced the song's release on 27 March 2019 through a social media post. As well as Rosalía and J Balvin, the songwriters are Frank Dukes, Teo Halm, Alejandro Ramírez and el Guincho.

Critical reception 
After its release, the song was received well by critics. Pitchfork named Rosalía's new single "a lighthearted mix of boastful tropes meant to be playful. It's a high-flying trifle of a song whose video and title show both artists at the top of their game". Rolling Stone had this to say about the song: "it's a modern take in reference to Spanish flamenco songs inspired by Afro-Caribbean sounds; ever the champion of cross-cultural experimentation, Rosalía has ultimately described it as her personal homage to classic reggaeton."

Commercial performance 
Within 24 hours on streaming platforms, the song received 201,000 Spotify streams in Spain, beating Aitana's "Teléfono" as the most-streamed female song in a single day in Spotify Spain. After a week, the song had been streamed over 15 million times of which 4.71M came from Spain. This set the record for the most streamed song in Spain in only a week. Its music video received over 22 million views in that time. The song debuted number one in Spain, being Rosalía's second number one there after "Di mi nombre". "Con altura" topped the Argentina Hot 100 chart in July 2019.

Music video 
Rosalía shared a preview of the music video on 27 March 2019. The video itself premiered on the singer's YouTube channel the day after. The video features Spanish dance formation, Las Ocho Rosas (who are Rosalía's backup dancers) and J Balvin inside a plane while dancing to the song and piloting the plane. The music video was directed by Director X, marking the first time they collaborate. It reached social media virality and drew comparisons to the music video of "Toxic" by Britney Spears.

In the third week of June 2019, it became the most-viewed music video globally in a single week, with more than 19 million views in 7 days. A week later, the music video had been viewed more than 500 million times. Starting 9 July, it became the most-viewed music video by a female artist of 2019, a record previously held by Ariana Grande's "7 Rings". It reached one billion views by mid-October.

Personnel 
Credits adapted from Tidal, Jaxsta, and The New York Times.

Production

 El Guincho – production, songwriting; vocals
 Frank Dukes – production, songwriting
 Rosalía – production, songwriting; vocals
 Sky Rompiendo – production, songwriting
 J Balvin – songwriting; vocals
 Teo Halm – production, songwriting; background vocals
 Aury "Mariachi Budda" Pineda – songwriting

Technical

 Morning Estrada – recording engineer
 El Guincho – recording engineer
 Manny Marroquin – mixing
 Chris Galland – assistant engineer
 Jeremie Inhaber – assistant engineer
 Robin Florent – assistant engineer
 Michelle Mancini – mastering

Charts

Weekly charts

Year-end charts

Certifications

Release history

See also
 List of Billboard Argentina Hot 100 number-one singles of 2019
 List of number-one singles of 2019 (Spain)
 List of Billboard Mexico Airplay number ones

References 

2019 songs
2019 singles
J Balvin songs
Number-one singles in Spain
Argentina Hot 100 number-one singles
Rosalía songs
Song recordings produced by el Guincho
Songs written by J Balvin
Songs written by Frank Dukes
Songs written by Rosalía
Latin Grammy Award for Best Urban Song
Songs written by el Guincho
Songs written by Teo Halm
Number-one singles in Venezuela
Music videos directed by Director X